Turn the Page may refer to:

Music
 Turn the Page (album), by Waylon Jennings
 "Turn the Page" (Bob Seger song), also covered by Metallica
 "Turn the Page" (Bobby Valentino song)
 "Turn the Page", a song by Aaliyah from the soundtrack of the film Music of the Heart
 "Turn the Page", a song by Blind Guardian from A Twist in the Myth
 "Turn the Page", a song by Chantal Kreviazuk from What If It All Means Something
 "Turn the Page", a song by Hypocrisy from Catch 22
 "Turn the Page", a song by Rush from Hold Your Fire
 "Turn the Page", a song by The Streets from Original Pirate Material

Other media
 "Turn the Page" (Californication), an episode of the American series Californication
 Turn the Page, an e-book in the Starfleet Corps of Engineers series